Herman Coessens (22 August 1943 –  January 2023) was a Belgian actor.

Coessens was most known as a stage actor at  where he played between the 1970s and 1990s.

Coessens was married to actress Lieve Moorthamer. He died in January 2023, at the age of 79.

References

External links
 
 

1943 births
2023 deaths
20th-century Flemish male actors
Belgian stage actors
Belgian television actors
People from Aalst, Belgium
Place of death missing